The Nasty class of fast patrol boats were a set of 20 vessels built for the United States Navy to a Norwegian design and purchased in the 1960s for covert operations during the Vietnam War. Following the conflict they remained in service until the early 1980s.

Construction
Following World War II the US Navy had little use for fast attack craft, and most of her PT boats were disposed of shortly after VJ Day. 

The USN ordered two vessels, which were delivered in 1962 and were designated PTF 3 and PTF 4. 
This was followed in 1966 with an order for 14 more (PTF's 5-16), with an agreement for a further six to be built under licence by Trumpy of Annapolis. Trumpy's had been a major contributor to the USN's PT fleet in World War II, and had been one of just four yards asked post-war to build a prototype PT boat to consolidate wartime experience and the lessons learned.

The Norwegian boats were delivered in 1964, and the Trumpy boats three years later.

A subsequent improved version, the Osprey class, was larger with aluminum instead of wooden hulls, of which four were operated by the U.S.Navy, assigned hull numbers PTF-23 through PTF-26.

Service history

All vessels of the class saw action during the war in Vietnam, being employed by the special forces for clandestine operations along the coast of North Vietnam. During these operations six boats were lost; one (PTF 4) in 1964 and five more in 1966. In 1966 four boats were transferred to the South Vietnamese Navy, though they were returned and re-commissioned in 1970.

With the end of the conflict the need for these boats evaporated, and the high maintenance costs of such vessels militated against retaining them. Most were disposed of in the 1970s and all were gone by 1981, except for PTF 17, which is on display at the Buffalo and Erie County Naval & Military Park.

List of vessels

Notes

References
 Gardiner, Robert; Chumbley, Stephen Conway's All The World's Fighting Ships 1947–1995 (1995) Naval Institute Press, Annapolis

External links
The "Nasty Class" Fighting Boat (Dan Withers)
The Navy’s Nasty Class Patrol Boats (HistoryNet.com, World_History_Group)

Torpedo boats of the United States Navy
Nasty, USN
Ships built in Mandal, Norway
Patrol boat classes